Faith is an unincorporated community in Norman County, Northwestern Minnesota, United States, dating back to circa 1868.

Its history has included a flour mill, stores, blacksmith shops, school, and several other businesses.

The ZIP code for Faith is 56584, and the area code is 218.

References

Unincorporated communities in Norman County, Minnesota
Unincorporated communities in Minnesota